A patache (occasionally "patax" or "pataje") is a type of sailing vessel with two masts, very light and shallow, a sort of cross between a brig and a schooner, which originally was a warship, being intended for surveillance and inspection of the coasts and ports. It was used as a tender to the fleet of vessels of more importance or size, and also for trans-Pacific travel, but later began to be used for trading voyages, carrying cargo burdens of 30 tons or more.

History
Pataches were used by the Spanish Navy (Armada Española) in the 15th–18th centuries mainly for the protection and monitoring of the overseas territories of the Spanish Empire. Because of their lightness and speed of movement privateers favored them in attacking commercial vessels. Fleets of pataches participated in several historical battles:

The attempted Spanish invasion of England by the Spanish Armada in 1588.
The Battle of Ponta Delgada (Battle of Terceira Island) in 1582, between the French and Spanish.
They were part of Spain's Atlantic fleet, the Armada del Mar Océano from about 1700.
The Battle of the Downs between the Spanish and Dutch navies was fought on 31 October 1639 in the roadstead of the Downs, the shoals near the coast of County Kent in England, in the course of the Eighty Years War.

List of historical pataches
Santiago, the smallest vessel in the Loaísa expedition to the Pacific in 1525-26. After losing sight of her sister ships on 1 June 1526, Santiago sailed north in a 10,000 kilometer voyage along the Pacific coast of South America, Central America and Mexico, becoming the first European vessel to pass within sight of North America's western coastline.
San Lucas, piloted by Lope Martín and commanded by Alonso de Arellano, was part of the expedition of Miguel López de Legazpi to the Philippines in 1564. It is a matter of some contention whether it was this ship or Urdaneta's much larger nao, the San Pedro, that was first to discover the crucial return path (or tornaviaje) across the Pacific from the Philippines to New Spain.
St. Nicholas, a frigate acquired by the Spanish crown in 1636 from Gabriel Tamaril.
Galgo (Greyhound) and The Margarita, belonging to the Royal Navy Guard of the Indies run of the Spanish colonial convoy system, were stranded on the island of Bermuda in 1639.
San Juan and San Pedro (1639), Basque and Flemish pataches, respectively, belonging to Juana Larando, the corsair widow from Donostia-San Sebastian, pillaged ships off the coast of France and in the English Channel.
Buen Jesús, sent by the Spanish crown in 1648 from Panama to the Spanish colony of the Philippine Islands to discover if they had fallen into the hands of the Netherlands.
Santa Cruz, part of the Tierra Firme Fleet, built in 1698 in the royal shipyards of Guayaquil, Ecuador; armed with 44 cannons and a crew of 300 sailors under the command of Nicolas de la Rosa, Count de Vega Florida.
Nuestra Señora del Carmen (Our Lady of Carmen), commanded by Captain Araoz in 1708.
Germain, sunk in 1898 in Portosín, Galicia.

See also
Spanish Armada
Spanish treasure fleet
Charles II of Spain
Philip V of Spain

References

Further reading
Cesáreo Fernández Duro. Armada Española, desde la unión de los reinos de Castilla y Aragón. Editado por el Museo Naval de Madrid, 1972.

External links

Museo Naval (Website of the Museo Naval de Madrid)
Museo Naval de Madrid. Centro Virtual Cervantes
The Oxford Companion to Ships and the Sea 2006: Urca
The Oxford Companion to Ships and the Sea 2006: Fly-boat

Warships
Sailboat types
Age of Sail ships